The Socialist Equality Party is a Trotskyist political party in Britain. It is one of several Socialist Equality Parties affiliated with the International Committee of the Fourth International.  The ICFI publishes daily news articles, perspectives and commentaries on the World Socialist Web Site.

History
The party's origins lie in the Workers Revolutionary Party (WRP) until the majority of that party split from the ICFI in 1986. A group in the WRP supported the ICFI and left the WRP.  Initially known as the Workers Revolutionary Party (Internationalist), they soon became the International Communist Party, based in Sheffield and led by David Hyland. The group stood in several elections before renaming themselves the Socialist Equality Party in 1996, in line with other sections of the international organisation. Hyland died in 2013.

Programme

The party's manifesto claims the necessity for the development of a new and genuinely socialist movement against a Conservative Party government. It calls for the unity of workers throughout Britain and internationally.

The manifesto states: "The fight against war is bound up with the struggle to put an end to the capitalist profit system by reorganizing economic life to meet the social interests of the vast majority of the world's population rather than the selfish interests of a parasitic elite."

Recent interventions

The SEP held a public meeting in Sheffield on 23 February 2011 to address the attempts to extradite Julian Assange.  Robert Stevens spoke in defence of Assange, characterising the legal proceedings as "a manhunt".

NHS Fightback was launched on 21 January 2013.

The SEP held a series of meetings in October 2013 to oppose imperialist intervention in Syria and raise the danger of world war.

Elections

The SEP ran candidates in the 2007 Scottish Parliament elections and the 2007 Welsh Assembly elections, but failed to gain any seats. The party ran a candidate, Chris Talbot, in the Haltemprice and Howden by-election who received 84 votes.  Two candidates stood in the 2010 general election, David O'Sullivan in Oxford East, who received 116 votes, and Robert Skelton in Manchester Central, who received 54 votes.

The SEP stood in the 2014 European Parliament election in the North West constituency.

It urged a 'no' vote in the 2014 Scottish independence referendum.

The SEP stood two candidates in the 2015 general election, and three candidates in the 2019 general election.

References

External links 
 
World Socialist Web Site

International Committee of the Fourth International
Political parties established in 1986
Politics of Sheffield
Far-left political parties
Trotskyist organisations in the United Kingdom
Workers Revolutionary Party (UK)
1986 establishments in the United Kingdom